Harold Holton (born October 1, 1952) is a Canadian football player who played professionally for the Calgary Stampeders, Ottawa Rough Riders and Toronto Argonauts.

References

1952 births
Living people
Calgary Stampeders players
Toronto Argonauts players
Ottawa Rough Riders players
UTEP Miners football players